Richard Trevor (30 September 1707 – 9 June 1771) was an English prelate of Welsh descent, who served as Bishop of St Davids from 1744 to 1752 and Bishop of Durham from 1752 until his death.

Life
Trevor was born at Glynde in Sussex, the family seat of the Trevors who had originated in 16th century Wales.  He was educated at Westminster School and at Queen's College, Oxford, and became a fellow of All Souls in 1727.  He became a canon of Christ Church, Oxford in 1735.

A statue of Bishop Trevor was placed in the Bishop's Chapel at Bishop Auckland in 1775 by Joseph Nollekens.

Legacy
After his death, the estate of Glynde passed to his elder brother, Robert Hampden-Trevor, 1st Viscount Hampden.

Art collection
Bishop Trevor was a supporter of the Jewish Naturalisation Act 1753. This interest in Jewish causes is reflected in his purchase in 1756 of 12 paintings by the 17th-century Spanish artist Zurbarán from a series known as Jacob and his twelve sons, depicting the Old Testament patriarch Jacob and his sons. They were installed at Auckland Castle, a property of the Bishops of Durham, and remained in the ownership of the Church of England until 2011, when they were transferred, along with the castle, to a charitable trust backed by philanthropist Jonathan Ruffer,

Gallery

References

External links
 

1707 births
1771 deaths
People from Glynde
People educated at Westminster School, London
Alumni of The Queen's College, Oxford
Fellows of All Souls College, Oxford
Bishops of St Davids
Bishops of Durham
Burials in Sussex
18th-century art collectors
18th-century Welsh Anglican bishops
18th-century Church of England bishops
Younger sons of barons